Julius Scriver (February 5, 1826 – September 5, 1907) was a politician in Quebec, Canada.

Born in Hemmingford, Lower Canada (now Quebec), the son of John Scriver and Lucretia Manning, he studied at the Workman's School in Montreal and the University of Vermont. He became a miller and tanner in Hemmingford.

In 1867, he was elected to the Legislative Assembly of Quebec representing the provincial riding of Huntingdon. In an 1869 by-election, he was acclaimed as Liberal Member of Parliament in the federal riding of Huntingdon. He was re-elected in 1872 (acclaimed), 1874, 1878 (acclaimed), 1882, 1887 (acclaimed), 1891, and 1896. He died at Westmount in 1907.

References

1826 births
1907 deaths
Liberal Party of Canada MPs
Members of the House of Commons of Canada from Quebec
Quebec Liberal Party MNAs